Carlo Rancati  (28 April 1940 – 22 November 2012) was an Italian cyclist. Competing as an amateur track racer, he won silver medals at the 1964 Summer Olympics and at the 1964 Track Cycling World Championships both in the team pursuit. He then became a professional road racer, but with little success.

References

1940 births
2012 deaths
Italian male cyclists
Olympic silver medalists for Italy
Cyclists at the 1964 Summer Olympics
Olympic cyclists of Italy
Olympic medalists in cycling
Cyclists from Milan
Medalists at the 1964 Summer Olympics